Camille Huyghe (born 16 February 1930) is a French former professional racing cyclist. He rode in the 1956 Tour de France.

References

External links
 

1930 births
Living people
French male cyclists
Sportspeople from Pas-de-Calais
Cyclists from Hauts-de-France